Emanuele Gerada KC*HS (18 May 1920 – 21 January 2011) was a Maltese prelate of the Roman Catholic Church, a Vatican diplomat and titular Archbishop of Nomentum. One Maltese obituary  recalled him as "a generous, well-read and intelligent man."

Biography
Gerada was born in Malta and ordained a priest on 1 August 1943 for the Archdiocese of Malta. He studied in Rome for a doctorate in canon law and joined the Vatican's diplomatic service, in which he served for most of his career.

He was appointed auxiliary bishop of the Archdiocese of Malta (then to Coadjutor Archbishop in 1968) and titular Bishop of Nomentum on 15 February 1967 and was consecrated on 18 June 1967.  A former priest-secretary recalled at the time of his death that one of Gerada's achievements was an improvement in the relations between the Maltese Church and the Labour Party. Such had been the deterioration in the relationship that Catholic Labour supporters were denied burial in the consecrated section of cemeteries and voting Labour was declared a mortal sin. But Gerada negotiated an agreement acceptable to both sides.

Gerada resumed his diplomatic career with the Holy See when he was appointed apostolic nuncio to El Salvador and Guatemala on 8 November 1973. In this post he was said to lobby for the appointment of Archbishop Oscar Romero but Gerada later objected when Romero cancelled many Sunday masses after the state-sponsored murder of Jesuit priest Fr Rutilio Grande in 1977.

On 15 October 1980 he was appointed apostolic pro-nuncio to Pakistan and served until his appointment as Apostolic Nuncio to Ireland on 4 February 1989. His arrival in Ireland was greeted warmly coming after the rather austere and conservative Archbishop Gaetano Alibrandi. Gerada played a key role when the Vatican attempted to silence Bishop Brendan Comiskey because of his views on priestly celibacy. Later reports said a priest with suspicions about the deviant behaviour of Fr Brendan Smyth wrote to Archbishop Gerada.

Gerada retired on 17 October 1995 and died on 21 January 2011.

See also

Archdiocese of Malta

References

External links
Catholic-Hierarchy
Archdiocese of Malta

Archbishops of Malta
Apostolic Nuncios to Ireland
Apostolic Nuncios to El Salvador
Roman Catholic titular archbishops
20th-century Roman Catholic titular bishops
1920 births
2011 deaths
Maltese expatriates in Pakistan
Apostolic Nuncios to Pakistan
Auxiliary bishops of Malta